Aglossosia albescens is a moth of the subfamily Arctiinae. It is found in Nigeria and Sierra Leone.

References

Moths described in 1907
Lithosiini
Moths of Africa
Insects of West Africa